Louis Hamelin (born June 9, 1959 in Saint-Séverin-de-Proulxville, Quebec) is a Canadian journalist and fiction writer. He won the Governor General's Award for French-language fiction in 1989 for his novel La Rage, and was nominated for the same award in 1995 for his novel Betsi Larousse, ou l'ineffable eccéité de la loutre and in 2006 for his short story collection Sauvages.

Having graduated from McGill University and the Université du Québec à Montréal, he has also worked as a journalist and literary critic for Le Devoir.

His 2010 novel La Constellation du Lynx, a fictionalized account of the 1970 October Crisis, won numerous literary awards in Quebec, including the Prix littéraire des collégiens, the Prix des libraires du Québec, the Grand Prix littéraire de la Presse québécoise and the Prix Ringuet. An English translation by Wayne Grady, titled October 1970, was published in 2013 and was named a longlisted nominee for that year's Scotiabank Giller Prize.

Works

Fiction
 La Rage (1989)
 Ces spectres agités (1991)
 Cowboy, 1992 (translated by Jean-Paul Murray as Cowboy, 2000)
 Betsi Larousse, ou l'ineffable eccéité de la loutre, 1994 (translated by Jean-Paul Murray as Betsi Larousse or the Ineffable Essence of the Otter, published by Ekstasis in 2015).
 Le Soleil des gouffres (1996)
 Le Joueur de flûte (2001)
 Sauvages (2006)
 La Constellation du Lynx, 2010 (translated by Wayne Grady as October 1970, 2013)
 Autour d'Éva. (2016)
 Les crépuscules de la Yellowstone (2020)

Non-fiction
 Les Étranges et édifiantes aventures d'un oniromane, 1994
 Le Voyage en pot, 1999

References

1959 births
Canadian male novelists
20th-century Canadian novelists
21st-century Canadian novelists
Canadian short story writers in French
Canadian literary critics
People from Mauricie
Writers from Quebec
French Quebecers
Living people
Governor General's Award-winning fiction writers
McGill University alumni
Université du Québec à Montréal alumni
Canadian novelists in French
Canadian male short story writers
20th-century Canadian short story writers
21st-century Canadian short story writers
20th-century Canadian male writers
21st-century Canadian male writers
Canadian male non-fiction writers
Le Devoir people